Alluaudina is a genus of harmless snakes in the family Pseudoxyrhophiidae. The genus is endemic to the island of Madagascar.

Species
Two species are recognized as being valid.

Alluaudina bellyi Mocquard, 1894
Alluaudina mocquardi Angel, 1939

Etymology
The generic name, Alluaudina, is in honor of French entomologist Charles Alluaud, who was one of the two collectors of the type specimen of A. bellyi. The specific name, bellyi, is in honor of a certain Mr. Belly who was the other collector of the same type specimen. The specific name, mocquardi, is in honor of French herpetologist François Mocquard, the author of this genus.

References

Further reading
Angel F (1939). "Reptiles et Batrachiens de Madagascar et de la Réunion. Description d`un serpent nouveau du genere Alluaudina". Bulletin du Muséum National d'Histoire Naturelle de Paris, Series 2, 11: 536–538. (Alluaudina mocquardi, new species). (in French).
Boulenger GA (1896). Catalogue of the Snakes in the British Museum (Natural History). Volume III. Containing the Colubridæ (Opisthoglyphæ and Proteroglyphæ), Amblycephalidæ, and Viperidæ. London: Trustees of the British Museum (Natural History). (Taylor and Francis, printers). xiv + 727 pp. + Plates I- XXV. (Genus Alluaudina, pp. 26, 38; A. bellyi, p. 38).
Mocquard F (1894). "Reptiles nouveaux ou insuffisamment connus de Madagascar ". Compte Rendu Sommaire des Séances de la Société Philomatique de Paris, Huitième Série [Eighth Series] 6 (17): 3–10. (Alluadina, new genus, p. 7; Alluadina bellyi, new species, pp. 7–8). (in French).

External links

Reptiles of Madagascar
Pseudoxyrhophiidae
Snake genera
Taxa named by François Mocquard